The Quispe Girls is a 2013 Chilean film written and directed by Sebastián Sepúlveda. It is based on the true story of the Quispe sisters and on Juan Radrigán's play "Las Brutas".

Plot 
The film depicts the tragic story of Justa, Lucía, and Luciana Quispe, three sisters who worked as goat-herders in the Chilean altiplano located in the Atacama desert region, the ancestral home of the indigenous Colla people.

In 1974, the sisters were worried that their animals were losing their economic value due to the growing rumors about the military government that had reached even the remotest areas of the country. Already affected by the loss of one of their sisters, they were further frightened by the news that the military had reached the nearby town of Copiapó. Tragically, Justa, Lucía, and Luciana committed suicide by hanging themselves from a rock, along with their two dogs.

Cast 
 Catalina Saavedra as Lucía Quispe
 Francisca Gavilán as Luciana Quispe
 Digna Quispe (the Quispe sisters' niece) as Justa Quispe
 Segundo Araya as Don Juan
 Alfredo Castro as Fernando

Shooting 
The filmmakers chose to shoot the suicide scene on the same rock where the real incident took place, and Justa Quispe's role was played by her niece, Digna Quispe. Director and screenwriter Sebastián Sepúlveda recalled his initial meeting with Digna, "I was very afraid of Digna when I first met her. She doesn't shake hands, she just shakes fingers in a very cold way," but later Digna agreed to participate in the project. Digna's personality was believed to reflect her life in the Altiplano, and it left an indelible mark on the film.

Awards 
 Venice Film Festival Critics' Week, best cinematography.
 Lima Film Festival Critics' Award, and best cinematography.
 Festival Filmar, Switzerland Best Film.
 Lakino Film Festival Best Film.
 Mar del Plata International Film Festival Mention Best Film.
 CINEMATROPICAL AWARDS 2015. Best First Film. Nominated Best Film, Best Director.

Reception 
 The film had a positive reception, though some criticized the awkwardness of integrating the inexperienced Digna Quispe with the rest of the crew. Digna, though brilliant, was illiterate and had no acting experience, with one reviewer saying her performance did not blend with those of Francisca Gavilán and Catalina Saavedra, the other two main characters.
 The Hollywood Reporter also gave a positive review, saying: "Sebastian Sepulveda's beautifully written, played and shot feature debut is as dark, pure and bleak as the lives of its subjects."

References

External links 
 

Films shot in Chile
2013 films
2013 drama films
Chilean drama films
French drama films
2010s Spanish-language films
Films about the Chilean military dictatorship
Films set in 1974
Films set in Chile
Drama films based on actual events
Chilean films based on plays
2010s French films